Yandex self-driving car (Yandex Self-Driving Group) is a autonomous car project of the Russian-based technology company Yandex. The first driverless prototype launched in May 2017. As of 2018, functional service was launched in Russia with prototypes also being tested in Israel and the United States. In 2019, Yandex revealed autonomous delivery robots based on the same technology stack as the company's self-driving cars. Since 2020, autonomous robots have been delivering food, groceries and parcels in Russia and the USA. In 2020, the self-driving project was spun-off into a standalone company under the name of Yandex Self-Driving Group (Yandex SDG).

History

2017 
In June 2017, Yandex.Taxi released a video demonstrating its driverless car technology. The prototype vehicle was a heavily modified Toyota Prius+ hybrid wagon/compact MPV equipped with three LiDAR optical distance sensors by Velodyne, six radar units, and six cameras and a GNSS sensor for navigation, with Intel CPUs and NVIDIA GPUs using the GNU operating system with the Linux kernel.

In November 2017, the results of a winter test were presented. The car drove successfully along snowy roads, despite the increased difficulties presented by the snow. The vehicle covered 300 km on a closed track.

2018 

Robo-taxi service was launched on in August 2018 in the university town of Innopolis in western Russia's Republic of Tatarstan. Service is free of charge. There is no one behind the wheel during the rides, and Yandex engineers occupy passenger seats and act as safety observers. In February 2020, it was reported that over 5,000 autonomous passenger rides were made in Innopolis.

At the end of 2018, Yandex obtained a license to use its self-driving cars on public roads in Nevada. In early 2019, the driverless cars carried out demo rides for the guests of the CES 2019 in Las Vegas. Unlike other prototypes demonstrated at the exhibition, the cars were circulating the streets of the city without any human control. There was no engineer at the wheel, only one in the passenger seat to take control of the car in case of emergency. In January 2020 Yandex provided autonomous rides for CES guests for the second time.

In December 2018, the company received permission from the Israeli Transport Ministry to test its driverless cars on public roads. This makes Israel the third country where the company is testing its self-driving vehicles. In September, 2019 the testing territory was expanded to include the city center.

2019 

In October 2019 Yandex made an announcement its self-driving cars passed 1 million miles in fully autonomous driving since it started testing the technology. Four other companies which previously announced similar or bigger distances are Waymo, GM Cruise, Baidu and Uber.

In November 2019, the company presented its autonomous delivery robot, based on the same self-driving technology the company is using for its autonomous cars. The robot is the size of a suitcase and navigates sidewalks at the speed of 5-8 km/h. As part of the initial testing phase, robots were operating on the Yandex 7,000 employees campus in Moscow, transporting small packages from one building to another.

2020 

In June 2020, Yandex presented the fourth generation of its self-driving cars. The vehicles are based on the Hyundai Sonata and developed in partnership with Hyundai Mobis.

In August 2020, the company opened an autonomous vehicle testing center in Ann Arbor.

In September 2020, the self-driving department of Yandex was spun-off into a standalone company under the name of Yandex Self-Driving Group (Yandex SDG) and received $150mln from the parent company.

2021 

In July 2021, Yandex SDG partnered with Grubhub for robot delivery on US college campuses. By the end of 2021, Yandex SDG and Grubhub had launched autonomous robotic delivery at  Ohio State University and the University of Arizona.

In October 2021, Yandex SDG announced a partnership with the Russian Post. As a part of this partnership, 36 robots started making autonomous deliveries from 27 post offices across Moscow.

In November 2021, the company announced that it would transition to using proprietary lidars on their autonomous vehicles.

2022 

In March 2022, the company said that it paused operation of its robotaxis in Ann Arbor, and ended a delivery partnership with Grubhub as Russian invasion of Ukraine continues.

Self-driving cars 

At the end of 2021, Yandex had around 170 autonomous vehicles in its fleet, which have driven over 14m kilometers (10m miles) across Russia, Israel and the USA.

The AVs are based on mass-produced car models, like the Toyota Prius and Hyundai Sonata. Each vehicle is equipped with four lidars, six radars and from 8 to 12 cameras. Since November 2021 Yandex is using proprietary lidars. Yandex SDG semi-solid state lidars can recognize objects as far as 500 meters away and are capable of changing the scanning pattern on-flight. Yandex SDG semi-solid state lidars can recognize objects as far as 500 meters away and are capable of changing the scanning pattern on-flight. They can increase point cloud density in the area near the vehicle when it is moving through a courtyard, or increase range when driving at a high speed on a highway.

Most of the fleet is operated in Moscow throughout the whole year, and are thoroughly tested in various weather conditions, including rain and snow. The company reported specific technologies developed to deal with bad weather. These include lidar cloud filtering from snowflakes reflections, and measuring friction coefficient for speed and maneuver planning.

Autonomous delivery robots 

Yandex SDG presented its autonomous delivery robots in late 2019. The first prototypes were delivering documents between buildings on Yandex campus in Moscow. In May 2020 robots entered their first commercial deployment at the Skolkovo Innovation Center, where they were helping the town's administration with document transportation across the Center territory.

In late 2020, robots joined Yandex.Eats food delivery service and started making food and grocery deliveries in several districts of Moscow. Half a year later Yandex SDG partnered with Grubhub for robot delivery on US college campuses. By the end of 2021 companies launched autonomous robotic delivery in The Ohio State University and the University of Arizona.

Yandex autonomous delivery robots operate on the same technology as the company's autonomous cars. Robots are equipped with the same types of sensors as the cars (lidars, radars and cameras) which means they can reuse localization and perception algorithms developed for cars. Robots also reuse many neural networks, specifically for prediction of other road users’ behavior. These networks were initially developed for cars, with the data being  tested, adapted, and implemented for robots.

Robots move at a speed of 5-8 km/h (3-5 mph), can autonomously navigate crosswalks and recognize traffic lights. Average working time on a single charge is about 8–12 hours. The last generation of Yandex robots have replaceable batteries.

Partnerships

Hyundai Mobis 

In March 2019, an agreement was signed between Yandex and Hyundai to work on autonomous car systems. They will develop control systems for autonomous vehicles for level 4 and level 5, the categories of automation defined as requiring limited to no human intervention.

The objective of the partnership is to provide a turnkey solution, which can be used by other manufacturers.
The companies plan to show the first prototype of the joint project by the end of 2019.

The companies noted that it is also possible to expand cooperation in the areas such as speech, navigation, and mapping technologies.

In July 2019 Hyundai Mobis and Yandex presented self-driving Hyundai Sonata 2020 as the first result of the collaboration. In June 2020, Yandex presented the fourth generation of its self-driving cars, based on Hyundai Sonatas.

Criticism 
Yandex discloses only the number of autonomous kilometers driven by cars in autonomous mode, but does not disclose the disengagement rate.

As for all autonomous machines, disengagement rate (the frequency in which human drivers were forced to take control) is crucial. Due to the lack of standards for the data which is indicated in the reports, companies are allowed to exclude certain incidents in a manner which is not standardised, making direct comparison impossible.

See also
Yandex.Taxi

References

Experimental self-driving cars
Yandex
2017 establishments in Russia